Ultraman (stylized as ULTRAMAN) is a Japanese manga series written by Eiichi Shimizu and drawn by Tomohiro Shimoguchi of Linebarrels of Iron fame. Published in Monthly Hero's since the magazine's inaugural issue. It is part of the Ultraman franchise and a manga sequel of the 1966 television series. The series has been collected in 18 tankōbon volumes as of April 2022.

A 3DCG original net animation (ONA) anime adaptation co-produced by Production I.G and Sola Digital Arts was released on Netflix in April 2019. A second season was released in April 2022.  A third and final season will be released in 2023.

Story

Decades have passed since the events of Ultraman, with the legendary  now a memory, as it is believed he returned home after fighting the many giant aliens that invaded the Earth. Shin Hayata's son Shinjiro seems to possess a strange ability, and it is this ability, along with his father's revelation that he was Ultraman, that leads Shinjiro to battle the new aliens invading the Earth as the new Ultraman.

Media

Manga
The series began serialization in the first ever issue of  magazine, published on November 1, 2011. The magazine ceased publication on October 30, 2020, and the series was transferred to Comiplex website, starting publication on November 27, 2020. The first collected tankōbon volume was published on September 8, 2012. In 2014, support videos were streamed at the official YouTube site of Monthly Hero's, featuring Ruriko Kojima, Takeshi Tsuruno (actor of Shin Asuka from Ultraman Dyna) and Susumu Kurobe (actor of Shin Hayata from Ultraman). The three were even interviewed, as well as reviewing chapter 4 of the manga themselves.

A portal site for the Ultraman manga was announced and launched on October 16, 2014. On May 1, 2015, an alien character design contest was announced for contestants to draw their respective aliens. Winning entries got their characters to appear in volume 7 of Ultraman. The contest ended and the winning entries were announced on August 3, 2015. These aliens made their appearances in Volume 7 as members of the mercenary group the Ace Killer Squad.

Several tankōbon volumes are also provided with extras, such as soft vinyl figures of Shinjiro's Ultraman Suit in Volume 5, Moroboshi's Ultraman Suit Version 7.2 in Volume 7, and a special edition Volume 8 bundled with a DVD, as well as commentaries, such as in Volume 1 by AKB48 member Sayaka Akimoto, Volume 4 by Hideo Kojima, Volume 5 by Koichi Sakamoto and Volume 9 by Hideo Ishiguro (Ultraman Orb).

On June 23, 2015, Viz Media welcomed the creators of the Ultraman manga series, Eiichi Shimizu and Tomohiro Shimoguchi, at the 2015 Comic-Con International: San Diego. Viz Media licensed the series for English language release in North America in February 2015, and the first volume was released on August 18, 2015.

Volume list

Motion comic
The first release was all six chapters from Volume 1 of the manga, with Ryōhei Kimura was the first cast to be announced and voicing the main character Shinjiro Hayata. Soon, more casts were added as well while the Motion Comic in progress. Two special Motion Comics were bundled alongside a special release of Volume 8 of Ultraman manga alongside the ULTRASINGLES.

Discography
A single titled as ULTRASINGLES was released alongside the special release of Volume 8. The single contains three songs by Maaya Uchida, all of them were sung by her character, Rena Sayama, in the Motion Comic, with the lyrics provided by Eiichi Shimizu. The third single, "Ultlove", was first released in the official YouTube site of Monthly Hero's in late December 2015.

Lovely Me
Composer: 
Authentic
Composer: 

Composer/Tsugaru-jamisen: 
Guitar Player: Eiichi Shimizu

Anime
An anime adaptation of the manga was announced in November 2017, which was later revealed to be a 3DCG anime co-produced by Production I.G and Sola Digital Arts. The anime will be co-directed by Kenji Kamiyama and Shinji Aramaki. Nobuko Toda and Kazuma Jinnouchi are composing the music. The series was released on Netflix on April 1, 2019. Oldcodex performed the series' ending theme song "Sight Over The Battle."

During the 2019 Annecy International Animated Film Festival, Netflix announced that a second season is in production. The staff are returning to reprise their roles, with the addition of Hiroyuki Uchiyama as series director. A kickoff event for the second season occurred on August 24, 2021. Japanese voice actor Tatsuhisa Suzuki was originally announced to voice the new character, Kotaro Higashi, but eventually stepped down in August 2021 after he decided to suspend his activities in voice acting for the time being. Tomoaki Maeno replaced Suzuki for the role. The second season was released on April 14, 2022.

A third and final season is set to be released in 2023.

Episode list

Season 1 (2019)

Season 2 (2022)

Video game
On January 10, 2020, an Ultraman mobile game based on the manga has been announced for released on iOS and Android devices. The game, titled Ultraman: Be Ultra, launched in early 2020 in Japan.

Reception
In the week of June 29 to July 5, 2015, Japanese site Oricon revealed that the Volume 6 of Ultraman was placed at 33rd in a ranking with a total of estimated 26,214 sold copies. From July 6 to 12 of that year, Volume 6's selling was boosted to number with an estimated number of 73,673 copies. On December 28, 2015, to January 3, 2016, the Volume 7 of Ultraman was placed 20th rank with an estimated total of 43,969 copies. The ranking dropped to 38 in the week January 4–10 with a total of 68,100 copies. In the week of July 4–10, Volume 8 was ranked 20 with an estimated 41,077 sold. During the 2016 annual Comic-Con International, Ultraman is ranked 5th in "Best New Manga for Kids/Teens". In early 2017, Volume 9 was ranked 24th with a total of 59,898 copies.

The manga sold over 2.4 million copies by 2017. As of 2018, the manga has sold more than 2.8million copies.

Rebecca Silverman of the Anime News Network reviews volume 1 of the manga and praises Shinjiro for his plot involvements in the storyline, although highlighting that "the timeskip is a bit abrupt, as is Bemular's introduction".

Merchandise
On April 30, 2016, a 1:1 scale FRP version of Dan Moroboshi/Ultraman Suit Version 7.2's Spacium Sword was announced to be released at August 2016 and pre-orders were made available at 55,000 Yen (59,400 Yen if tax is included) in Eikoh.

In October 2015, an articulated action figure of Shinjiro Hayata in his Ultraman Suit, which was made by a collaboration between Ultra Act (Tsuburaya's own figure line) and S.H. Figuarts. The figure is sold under the price of 6,840 Yen and pre-orders were made from October 23, 2015, while shipping started in May 2016. In 2016, Gecco Corp. produced a 1/6 scale diorama of Shinjiro Hayata in his Ultraman Suit, which has a removable head to switch between either Shinjiro or Ultraman Suit helmet. Another collaboration merchandise was made with Pioneer SE-MX9-K in releasing headphones themed after Shinjiro's Ultraman Suit helmet.

See also
 Getter Robo Devolution – Another manga series from the same creators

Notes

References

External links
 
 

Ultraman
2011 manga
2019 anime ONAs
Japanese-language Netflix original programming
Netflix original anime
Production I.G
Science fiction anime and manga
Seinen manga
Shogakukan manga
Sola Digital Arts
Superheroes in anime and manga
Viz Media manga